The following is a list of notable people from and/or related to Abadan, Iran.

Academia
Jill Allibone (1932–1998), English architectural historian (born in Abadan, grew up in Iran)
Gholam hossein Davani (b. 1953), accountant
Yadolah Dodge (b. 1944), University Professor in Statistics and Probability
Ghazal Omid, author and legal scholar
Hamid Rashidi (b. 1961), lawyer
Alam Saleh Middle East academic

Activism, civil rights, and philanthropy
Abie Nathan (1927–2008), Israeli humanitarian and peace activist

Arts
Firoozeh Dumas (b. 1965), author
Bizhan Emkanian (b. 1953), actor
Hamid Farrokhnezhad (b. 1969), actor
Farzin (1952–1999), pop singer
Farhad Hasanzadeh (b. 1962), children's writer
Noreen Motamed (b. 1967), artist
Amir Naderi (b. 1946), film director
Khosrow Parvizi (1933–2012), film director
Zoya Pirzad (b. 1952), author
Siamak Shayeghi (b. 1954), film director and producer
Mahmoud Shoolizadeh (b. 1959), film director and screenwriter
Aramazd Stepanian (b. 1951), actor, producer, director and playwright
Nasser Taghvai (b. 1941), film director and screenwriter
Ahmad Irandoost (b. 1974), actor, singer and former bodyguard

Business
Cyma Zarghami (b. 1962/62), television executive

Politics and government
Ebrahim Rezaei Babadi (b. 1955), politician

Sports
Ali Abdollahzadeh (b. 1993), football defender
Ahmad Reza Abedzadeh (b. 1966), retired footballer
Patrik Baboumian (b. 1979), strongman
Abdolreza Barzegari (b. 1958), retired footballer
Karim Bavi (b. 1964), retired footballer
Mohsen Bayatinia (b. 1980), former footballer and coach
Ali Firouzi (b. 1955), football coach 
Bahman Golbarnezhad (1968–2016), Paralympic cyclist
Mehdi Hasheminasab (b. 1973), retired footballer
Ahmad Khaziravi (b. 1989), footballer
Mojahed Khaziravi (b. 1980), footballer
Gholam Hossein Mazloumi (1950–2014), footballer
Parviz Mazloumi (b. 1954), retired footballer
Hossein Nassim (b. 1952), swimmer
Hassan Nazari (b. 1956), football coach
Fakher Tahami (b. 1996), football forward
Hossein Vafaei (b. 1994), professional Snooker player

References

People from Khuzestan Province